County Road 562 is a county road in Vestland county, Norway.

Prior to 1 January 2010, the road was a Norwegian national road and it was called National Road 562. On 1 January 2010, it was transferred to the county.

Route
The road branches off from National Road 555 and runs through the Olsvik Tunnel, over Byfjorden on the Askøy Bridge, and then through the Stongafjell Tunnel. It continues across the western part of the island of Askøy in Askøy municipality and terminates at the village Skråmestø on the northern part of the island.

References

 
562
562
Askøy
Transport in Bergen